The ice hockey team rosters at the 1936 Winter Olympics consisted of the following players:

Austria
Head coach: Hans Weinberger

Belgium
Head coach:  Bert Forsyth

Canada
Head coach: Albert Pudas

Czechoslovakia
Head coach: Antonin Porges

France

Germany
Head coach:  Val Hoffinger

Great Britain
Head coach:  Percy Nicklin

Hungary
Head coach: Géza Lator

Italy
Head coach: Giampiero Medri

Japan
Head coach: Shunichi Tezuka

Latvia
Head coach: Arvīds Jurgens

Poland
Head coach: Lucjan Kulej

Sweden
Head coach:  Vic Lindquist

Switzerland
Head coach: Ulrich von Sury

United States
Head coach: Albert Prettyman

References

Sources

Hockey Hall Of Fame page on the 1936 Olympics

rosters
1936